Cibecue ( "Horizontally Red Valley/Canyon") is a census-designated place (CDP) in Navajo County, Arizona, United States, on the Fort Apache Indian Reservation. The population was 1,713 in the 2010 United States Census.

The current council leaders are Arnold Beach Sr. and Tony Alsenay.

The Cibecue community has a high unemployment rate, which was exacerbated by the Rodeo–Chediski Fire, Arizona's second-largest wildfire in recorded history. Education is the sector that employs the most people in the community.

Geography
Cibecue is located at  (34.039644, -110.485435).

Climate

Demographics

As of the census of 2000, there were 1,331 people, 323 households, and 268 families residing in the CDP. The racial makeup of the CDP was 96.0% Native American, 2.6% White, 0.1% Black or African American, 0.2% Asian, 0.2% from other races, and 0.9% from two or more races.  2.0% of the population were Hispanic or Latino of any race.

There were 323 households, out of which 54.8% had children under the age of 18 living with them, 41.8% were married couples living together, 34.1% had a female householder with no husband present, and 17.0% were non-families. 13.6% of all households were made up of individuals, and 2.8% had someone living alone who was 65 years of age or older.  The average household size was 4.11 and the average family size was 4.45.

In the CDP, the population was spread out, with 45.2% under the age of 18, 10.6% from 18 to 24, 25.9% from 25 to 44, 13.7% from 45 to 64, and 4.7% who were 65 years of age or older.  The median age was 21 years. For every 100 females, there were 96.6 males.  For every 100 females age 18 and over, there were 93.1 males.

The median income for a household in the CDP was $12,286, and the median income for a family was $13,750. Males had a median income of $52,639 versus $21,591 for females. The per capita income for the CDP was $5,941.  About 55.7% of families and 68.7% of the population were below the poverty line, including 72.5% of those under age 18 and 70.9% of those age 65 or over.

In 2010, Cibecue had the 18th-lowest median household income of all places in the United States with a population over 1,000.

Transportation 
Cibecue Airport is a public use general aviation airport located four nautical miles (7 km) southeast of the central business district of Cibecue.

The White Mountain Apache Tribe operates the Fort Apache Connection Transit, which provides local bus service.

Education 
The area is served by the Whiteriver Unified School District and the Dishchii' Bikoh Community School.

Dishchii'bikoh Community School, also called the Cibecue Community School, is a small K-12, grant-funded day school in Cibecue, Arizona. It is run by the Fort Apache Agency, a division of the Bureau of Indian Affairs. The school's superintendent is Juan Aragon. The school is subdivided into an elementary, middle, and high school, each with a separate principal.

Media
Cibecue is the focus of the seminal ethnography by Keith H. Basso entitled "Portraits of the 'Whiteman': Linguistic play and cultural symbols among the Western Apache" (1979).

Notes

References

Census-designated places in Navajo County, Arizona
Populated places of the Mogollon Rim
Arizona placenames of Native American origin
White Mountain Apache Tribe